Michael Graf is an Italian luger who competed during the early 2000s. A natural track luger, he won the bronze medal in the mixed team event at the 2003 FIL World Luge Natural Track Championships in Železniki, Slovenia

References
Mixed teams natural track World Champions

Italian male lugers
Living people
Year of birth missing (living people)
Italian lugers
Sportspeople from Südtirol